The Colours is a 1976 Iranian short film directed by Abbas Kiarostami.

Film details
By showing a series of different-coloured objects, the film aims to familiarize very young children with the various colours, and ends with a shot of a blackboard, a symbol of learning.

See also
List of Iranian films

External links

Films directed by Abbas Kiarostami
1976 films
1970s Persian-language films
Iranian short films